Vorotan is a village in the Goris Municipality of the Syunik Province in Armenia.

Demographics 
The Statistical Committee of Armenia reported its population was 307 in 2010, up from 271 at the 2001 census.

References 

Populated places in Syunik Province